Hunter Reese and Sem Verbeek were the defending champions but chose not to defend their title.

Jesper de Jong and Tim van Rijthoven won the title after defeating Julian Lenz and Roberto Quiroz 6–1, 7–6(7–3) in the final.

Seeds

Draw

References

External links
 Main draw

Open de Oeiras IV - Doubles